Notiosorex cockrumi, also called Cockrum's gray shrew or Cockrum's desert shrew, is a tiny species of shrews named in 2003. This red-toothed shrew, which is as light as a penny, is the first new mammal species from Arizona since 1977. Its range extends from Arizona to central Sonora, Mexico.

Distribution and Habitat 
The shrew is found in desert habitats from southeastern and south-central Arizona to central Sonora, Mexico. It typically inhabits desert shrub, and plant communities dominated by mesquite, agave, cholla, and oakbrush. It burrows in the soil or in fallen logs and debris.

Characteristics 
The shrew is very small and is insectivorous. It has a brown-gray color with a reddish-pink nose, tail and feet. Its nose has large whiskers and it also possesses large ears.

References

Notiosorex
Mammals described in 2003
Mammals of the United States
Mammals of Mexico